SN 2011dh was a supernova in the Whirlpool Galaxy (M51).  It was discovered on 31 May 2011, with an apparent magnitude 13.5. and confirmed by several sources, including the Palomar Transient Factory. A candidate progenitor was detected in Hubble Space Telescope images. The progenitor may have been a highly luminous yellow supergiant with an initial mass of 18-24 solar masses. The supernova peaked near apparent magnitude 12.1 on 19 June 2011. Emission spectra indicated that the explosion was a type II supernova, in which a massive star collapses once nuclear fusion has ceased in its core.

SN2011dh was the third supernova to be recorded in the Whirlpool galaxy since 1994 (following SN 1994I and SN 2005cs). The supernova frequency in the Milky Way is estimated to be around one event every 40 years.

References

External links 
 Light curves and spectra on the Open Supernova Catalog
 GIF animation of pre and post images of SN 2011dh
 Views of the developing supernova
 SN 2011dh progenitor?
 Magnitude comparison 2011-06-02
 Twitter Helps Astronomers Zero-In on M51 Supernova  (Jun 6, 2011 Ian O'Neill)
 M51 (Whirlpool Galaxy) at Las Cumbres Observatory on 6 Jun 2011
 Supernova sn2011dh in M51 is brightening! (June 14, 2011 Ian Musgrave)
 PTF11eon/SN2011dh: Discovery of a Type IIb Supernova From a Compact Progenitor in the Nearby Galaxy M51 (arXiv:1106.3551 : 17 Jun 2011)
 Panchromatic Observations of SN 2011dh Point to a Compact Progenitor Star (arXiv:1107.1876 : 10 Jul 2011)

20110531
Supernovae
Canes Venatici